Zephaniah Joseph Thomas (born 14 November 1989) is a footballer who plays as a midfielder for Brighouse Town and the Saint Kitts and Nevis national football team.

He is a former Rotherham United youth player who has also played non-league football with several clubs including Harrogate Town and Rossington Main, while also having an intermediate spell in the United States. Before he turned professional joining Belgian club Montegnée followed by a spell in Scottish First Division with Cowdenbeath. He then moved to North America for a second time playing for Canadian side Thunder Bay Chill before returning to English football.

Club career

Early career
Thomas who was born in Bradford started his career as a youth player at Rotherham United but left the club in 2008 having not appeared for the senior team. Following his release he joined Northern Premier League Premier Division side Ilkeston Town. After spending a few months with them he moved on to Emley before joining Harrogate Town. While at the Conference North side he was loaned out to local club Harrogate Railway Athletic. He then moved to the United States with fellow Englishman Jason Stokes to study at Garden City Community College while playing for their soccer team. However things didn't work out and he returned to England. Thomas then played for Parkgate before leaving them to join Rossington Main in November 2010. At the start 2011–12 season he joined Stocksbridge Park Steels for a short period before rejoining Rossington Main who he went on to make twenty appearances for, scoring ten goals. In December 2012, he signed a full-time professional contract with Belgian side Montegnée having been spotted by scout Simon O'Neill. He played his last game for Northern Counties East Football League side Rossington on 2 January 2012 against Appleby Frodingham before moving to Belgium. After six months with the Belgian Promotion D team, Thomas returned to England and was again looking for a new club while playing Sunday league football with Swinton WMC.

Cowdenbeath
On 22 August 2012, Thomas joined Scottish First Division side Cowdenbeath. He signed a one-year contract with the recently promoted side following a trial. He made his first appearance for the club just three days later at home to Hamilton Academical, coming off the bench as a substitute. After just a month with the club having made just three substitute appearances, he was selected by the Saint Kitts and Nevis national football team. His only start came against league leaders Partick Thistle at Firhill Stadium, with Cowdenbeath suffering a 2–1 defeat. Cowdenbeath boss Colin Cameron placed Thomas on the transfer list in early January 2013 and only a matter of days later he was released by club. After leaving Cowdenbeath, Thomas started working in a call centre.

Thunder Bay Chill
In March 2013, it was announced Thomas had agreed to join Canadian side Thunder Bay Chill. Thomas linked up with his new club in May 2013 but was ruled out of pre-season due to a groin injury. He also missed the opening games of the season against WSA Winnipeg. On 1 June, he made his début for Thunder Bay in 2–0 victory over Des Moines Menace at Fort William Stadium. In the next match versus St. Louis Lions which Thunder Bay won 3–0, Thomas provided an assist for teammate Sunny Omoregie to score. He set up a further two goals for his colleagues against Springfield Demize and Kansas City Brass. Thomas got his only goal for Thunder Bay in the penultimate game of the regular season.

Sheffield
Thomas returned to England following the expiration of his contract with Thunder Bay Chill and trained with Tranmere Rovers. His international clearance was delayed and therefore missed out on the chance to play for their reserve side. Ian Whitehorne, manager of Sheffield who play in the Northern Premier League Division One South, invited him for a trial. Thomas scored in his trial match and ultimately signed for the club at the beginning of September 2013.

Boston United
In October 2014, Thomas was offered a trial with Boston United having scored twice for his national side in September. In the trial he played for the Pilgrims' under-21 side against Horncastle Town, scoring a hat-trick. He joined the Conference North side on non-contract terms days later.

2016 onwards
In October 2016 he re-signed for Rossington Main from Mickleover Sports, having been with the latter since 2015. He scored on his third debut, against Grimsby Borough in the Northern Counties East Football League on 15 October 2016, but the spell with The Colliery was short-lived as he returned to Mickleover Sports in time for the FA Trophy game at Leamington on 29 October 2016. He transferred to Shaw Lane in February 2017, Stafford Rangers in March 2017 and Frickley Athletic later that same month. On 18 August 2017, he was brought back to Mickleover Sports once again. He made his debut for fellow Derbyshire club Glossop North End on 28 October 2017. In February 2018 he signed for Campion of 10th tier Northern Counties East League Division One, before relocating to Bradford neighbours and league rivals Eccleshill United shortly after. He made his debut at home against AFC Emley on 21 March 2018.

Prior to the 2018–19 Northern Premier League Division One West season, Leek Town announced his signature. He come off the bench in the 71st minute as Leek Town won the season opener at Skelmersdale United on 18 August 2018.

On 29 September 2018 he made another debut, for Brighouse Town of the Division One East, away at Glossop North End. He spent the remainder of the season with Town, before moving south to Belper Town of the – after a division restructuring – neighbouring Division One South East in June 2019. Later that year, he returned to Rossington Main. He joined Frickley Athletic for the third time in February 2020. Later on in the year he joined North Yorkshire side Selby Town. In December 2020, he returned to former club Brighouse Town.

International career

Thomas got in touch with the St. Kitts and Nevis Football Association to make them aware of his eligibility through contact Des Hazel, a former St. Kitts international. The FA reviewed some footage of Thomas and in September 2012, Thomas received an international call-up from Saint Kitts and Nevis to represent them in the Caribbean Cup. Despite having been born in England, he was eligible for Saint Kitts and Nevis due to his grandfather. He made his international début in a 2–0 victory over Anguilla. He started again in the following match against group favourites Trinidad and Tobago with the match ending in a 1–0 defeat.

Career statistics

International
Saint Kitts and Nevis goal tally first.

References

External links
Boston United official profile

1989 births
Living people
Saint Kitts and Nevis footballers
Saint Kitts and Nevis international footballers
English footballers
Footballers from Bradford
Association football forwards
Rotherham United F.C. players
Ilkeston Town F.C. (1945) players
Emley A.F.C. players
Harrogate Town A.F.C. players
Harrogate Railway Athletic F.C. players
Parkgate F.C. players
Rossington Main F.C. players
Stocksbridge Park Steels F.C. players
R.R.F.C. Montegnée players
Cowdenbeath F.C. players
Thunder Bay Chill players
Sheffield F.C. players
Mickleover Sports F.C. players
Scarborough Athletic F.C. players
Matlock Town F.C. players
Goole A.F.C. players
Boston United F.C. players
Frickley Athletic F.C. players
Shaw Lane A.F.C. players
Stafford Rangers F.C. players
Glossop North End A.F.C. players
Campion A.F.C. players
Eccleshill United F.C. players
Leek Town F.C. players
Selby Town F.C. players
Brighouse Town F.C. players
Scottish Football League players
USL League Two players
Northern Premier League players
National League (English football) players
English sportspeople of Saint Kitts and Nevis descent
Black British sportspeople
English expatriate sportspeople in Canada
Expatriate soccer players in Canada
English expatriate footballers